The year 1673 in science and technology involved some significant events.

Mathematics
 John Kersey begins publication of The Elements of that Mathematical Art Commonly Called Algebra.
 Samuel Morland publishes A Perpetual Almanack and Several Useful Tables.

Microbiology
 Antonie van Leeuwenhoek's observations with the microscope are first published in Philosophical Transactions of the Royal Society.

Physics
 Christiaan Huygens publishes his mathematical analysis of the pendulum, Horologium Oscillatorium sive de motu pendulorum.

Births
 August 10 – Johann Konrad Dippel, German theologian, alchemist and physician (died 1734)

Deaths
 May 6 – Werner Rolfinck, German scientist (born 1599)
 August 17 – Regnier de Graaf, Dutch physician and anatomist who discovered the ovarian follicles (born 1641)
 December 15 – Margaret Cavendish, Duchess of Newcastle-upon-Tyne, English natural philosopher (born 1623)

References

 
17th century in science
1670s in science